Manžan is a settlement in the City Municipality of Koper in the Littoral region of Slovenia.

References

External links

Manžan on Geopedia

Populated places in the City Municipality of Koper